The Waitoetoe River is a small river of the Taranaki Region of New Zealand's North Island. It flows close to the town of Urenui.

See also
List of rivers of New Zealand

References

Rivers of Taranaki
Rivers of New Zealand